The Barrett MRAD (Multi-role Adaptive Design) is a bolt-action sniper rifle designed by Barrett to meet the requirements of the SOCOM PSR. The MRAD is based on the Barrett 98B and includes a number of modifications and improvements. The Barrett MRAD was named the 2012 Rifle of the Year by the NRA.

Design
After the United States Special Operations Command (USSOCOM) announced their desire for a new precision sniper rifle in December 2009, Barrett created the MRAD in accordance with the specifications laid out by SOCOM. Building off of the successful Barrett 98B, the MRAD features multiple improvements such as a folding stock which allows the rifle to be transported more easily. When folded, the stock latches around the bolt handle which increases the security of transporting the rifle without increasing the width when it is unfolded. A major MRAD feature (and requirement of the military PSR solicitation) is a field-changeable barrel/caliber capability. Loosening two Torx screws in the receiver allows the removal of the barrel from the front of the receiver/handguard. With only a bolt face change, and in some cases a magazine change, caliber may be changed. The factory headspaced bolt face is provided with each barrel. Barrel/caliber change can occur in less than two minutes. In addition to the typical military requested calibers of .338 Lapua Magnum, .300 Winchester Magnum, and .308 Winchester calibers, Barrett also offers caliber conversion kits in .338 and .300 NORMA Magnum, 7mm Remington Magnum, .260 Remington, and 6.5mm Creedmoor. Barrel lengths are offered in 17" to 26", but not in all calibers.  Barrels are available in fluted and heavy profiles. The trigger module can be removed without tools, providing access to user-adjustable trigger pull weight and over travel, and making cleaning easier. Additional features of the MRAD include a single-button length-of-pull adjustment, adjustable cheek rest height, a polymer bolt guide which acts as a dust cover to reduce debris entering the action, a user reversible AR-15 style safety, an ambidextrous magazine release, and the ability to accept standard M16/AR15 style pistol grips. Early MRADs had 30 MOA slope full length 21.75" standard 1913 Picatinny rail on top of the receiver/handguard. Current MRADs feature 20 MOA slope rail. Shorter 2"-4" Picatinny rails sections may be user positioned at 3, 6, and 9 o'clock at several fore/aft positions along the handguard. MRADs are offered in several Cerakote colors.

Similar to the M16/AR15, the MRAD upper and lower receivers can be separated by pushing out rear and front two take-down pins. Pushing out only the rear take-down pin allows the upper receiver to tilt on its front take-down pin like an AR-15 to allow for maintenance in the field.

With match grade .338 Lapua Magnum ammunition the MRAD is capable of 0.5 MOA (minute of angle) accuracy at distances of up to 1500 meters. With standard ammunition, the accuracy drops to 0.75 MOA, which is still sub-MOA.

Precision Sniper Rifle
In 2013 the Remington Modular Sniper Rifle was selected as the winner of the PSR competition. 
However, in 2018 it was decided that the MK21 did not conform to SOCOM requirements at the time, and the program was re-competed as the MK22 ASR (Advanced Sniper Rifle).

MK 22 ASR and MK 22 PSR
MK 22 MOD 0 ASR (Advanced Sniper Rifle) is the designation for the Barrett MRAD variant ordered by USSOCOM. In 2019, U.S. Special Operations Command awarded Barrett Manufacturing a US$50 million contract for the ASR (Advanced Sniper Rifle) contract, ordering the Barrett MRAD with the ability to convert chambering between 7.62x51mm, .300 Norma Magnum, and .338 Norma Magnum. The MK 22 ASR is issued with Barrett's AML 338 suppressor and paired with the Precision Variable Power Scopes (P-VPS) SU-295/PVS Nightforce ATACR 5-25×56 and SU-295/PVS Nightforce ATACR 7-35×56.

MK 22 PSR (Precision Sniper Rifle) is the designation for the Barrett MRAD variant ordered by the US Army. In 2021, the US Army awarded Barrett a US49.9 million contract for delivery of 2,800 MK22 PSR rifles, while the Marine Corps planned to ordered 250. The MK 22 PSR will have conversion kits for .338 Norma Magnum, .300 Norma Magnum, and 7.62×51mm NATO. However, unlike the MK 22 ASR, it is issued with a Leupold Mark 5HD 5-25x56mm scope. The Army plans for the MK 22 to replace the currently in use M107 and M2010 sniper rifles. The Marine Corps intends to have the MK 22 to replace all M40A6 and MK 13 MOD 7 sniper rifles.

Users 
: In 2013, the MRAD was adopted by the Yamam, Israel's elite counter-terrorism and SWAT unit, as their long range sniper rifle, to replace old PGM 338 rifles. In 2018 the MRAD was adopted by the Israel Defense Forces.
: Introduced in 2018 as a replacement for the 7.62mm Arctic Warfare sniper rifles
: Ordered by the Norwegian Armed Forces in 2013. In use with Norwegian Special Operations Forces since 2015, as well as Kystjegerkommandoen and several Norwegian Army units. Snipers of Beredskapstroppen Delta of the Norwegian Police have also been seen with this rifle.
: Snipers in the AFU have been reported to be using MRAD rifles. 
: MK 22 MOD 0 Advanced Sniper Rifle (ASR) ordered by the U.S. Special Operations Command. MK 22 Precision Sniper Rifle (PSR) ordered by US Army. MK 22 rifle being considered by US Marine Corps, uncertain which variant.

See also 
 Barrett Model 98B
 Remington MSR
 Mk 13 rifle
 M110A1

References

External links 

 MRAD Official Website
 SOCOM PSR Specs

.338 firearms
Barrett firearms
Bolt-action rifles of the United States
Sniper rifles of the United States
Military equipment introduced in the 2010s